Broadview Park is a census-designated place (CDP) in Broward County, Florida, United States. The population was 7,125 at the 2010 census.

Geography
Broadview Park is located at  (26.098515, -80.207419).

Demographics

As of the census of 2000, there were 6,798 people, 2,122 households, and 1,606 families residing in the CDP. The racial makeup of the CDP was 67.92% White (37.3% were Non-Hispanic White,) 16.98% African American, 0.21% Native American, 1.94% Asian, 0.49% Pacific Islander, 8.16% from other races, and 4.31% from two or more races. Hispanic or Latino of any race were 42.32% of the population.

There were 2,122 households, out of which 41.6% had children under the age of 18 living with them, 50.5% were married couples living together, 17.6% had a female householder with no husband present, and 24.3% were non-families. 17.0% of all households were made up of individuals, and 4.5% had someone living alone who was 65 years of age or older.  The average household size was 3.17 and the average family size was 3.52.

In the CDP, the population was spread out, with 29.8% under the age of 18, 10.2% from 18 to 24, 33.6% from 25 to 44, 18.8% from 45 to 64, and 7.6% who were 65 years of age or older.  The median age was 31 years. For every 100 females, there were 108.1 males.  For every 100 females age 18 and over, there were 105.8 males.

The median income for a household in the CDP was $38,125, and the median income for a family was $39,176. Males had a median income of $27,473 versus $22,296 for females. The per capita income for the CDP was $14,591.  About 13.6% of families and 14.8% of the population were below the poverty line, including 18.2% of those under age 18 and 16.4% of those age 65 or over.

As of 2000, English as a first language accounted for 54.71% of all residents, while Spanish accounted for 41.80%, French Creole made up 1.57%, Tagalog was at 1.32%, and French was the mother tongue for 0.57% of the population.

References

Census-designated places in Broward County, Florida
Census-designated places in Florida